Majd Eddin Ghazal (born 21 April 1987) is a Syrian high jumper. He utilizes the Fosbury Flop style, jumping off his left leg. He was the national flag bearer at the 2012 Summer Olympics and at the 2016 Summer Olympics. In the Men's high jump event, he ranked 28th and did not advance to the final in 2012.  He qualified for the finals and finished 7th in 2016.

Career
At the 2015 World Championships held in Beijing's Olympic Stadium, the Birds Nest, he leaped a national record 2.29m on his first attempt in qualifying on August 28, but a miss at an earlier height placed him 15th, with only the top 14 advancing to the finals. He ended his 2015 season on October 5, winning the Military World Games held in Mungyeong, South Korea, and setting a new Meet & National record of 2.31m (7' 7").

He then on 18 May 2016 while competing in an International World Challenge (IWC) meet in Beijing, China, won that competition and, in so doing, raised his Syrian national record 3 times en route to a world-leading jump of 2.36 meters (7' 8-3/4"). At the Bird’s Nest stadium, the 29-year-old Ghazal successively cleared 2.32m (first attempt), 2.34m and 2.36m (on second attempt each, adding three centimeters to the 2016 world lead.

In 2017, he was one of five athletes training in Damascus. He trains with shot putter and discus thrower Hiba Omar.

On 13 August 2017, Ghazal won the bronze medal at the World Championships in London, UK with a 2.29 m jump. It was Syria's second world medal in history, after Ghada Shouaa (gold in 1995 and bronze in 1999 competing in the heptathlon).

Competition record

References

External links

Syrian male high jumpers
1987 births
Living people
Athletes (track and field) at the 2008 Summer Olympics
Athletes (track and field) at the 2012 Summer Olympics
Athletes (track and field) at the 2016 Summer Olympics
Athletes (track and field) at the 2020 Summer Olympics
Olympic athletes of Syria
Sportspeople from Damascus
Athletes (track and field) at the 2010 Asian Games
Athletes (track and field) at the 2014 Asian Games
Athletes (track and field) at the 2018 Asian Games
Asian Games bronze medalists for Syria
Medalists at the 2018 Asian Games
Asian Games medalists in athletics (track and field)
World Athletics Championships athletes for Syria
World Athletics Championships medalists
Athletes (track and field) at the 2009 Mediterranean Games
Athletes (track and field) at the 2013 Mediterranean Games
Athletes (track and field) at the 2018 Mediterranean Games
Mediterranean Games gold medalists for Syria
Mediterranean Games medalists in athletics
Asian Athletics Championships winners
Mediterranean Games gold medalists in athletics
Islamic Solidarity Games medalists in athletics
Islamic Solidarity Games competitors for Syria
Athletes (track and field) at the 2022 Mediterranean Games
21st-century Syrian people